Keith Cawthon Converse (born September 12, 1957) is an American college swimming coach and former competition swimmer.  He was one of the United States' pre-eminent distance swimmers during the 1970s, competing at the 1976 Summer Olympics and setting a pair of NCAA records while swimming for the Alabama Crimson Tide swim team at the University of Alabama.  On March 26, 1977, while swimming under Crimson Tide head coach Don Gambril, he set an NCAA record and became the first man in swimming history to break the 15-minute barrier in the mile on his way to winning the 1,650-yard freestyle when he clocked 14:57.30 at the NCAA Championships in Cleveland, Ohio.

He also set the NCAA record in the 1,000-yard freestyle during a dual meet at Auburn University. Prior to his record-shattering performances in 1977, Converse swam as a member of the 1976 U.S. Olympic Team as an 18-year-old, placing ninth in the men's 400-meter freestyle.

He was the head swimming coach at the Air Force Academy from 1988-2017. From 1988-1996 he was the head coach for both the men's and women's teams. During this time, the men's team went from went from last in the Western Athletic Conference to second, and the women made AFA history by winning two NCAA Division II championships in a row (1995 &1996). In 1997, Converse moved his focus to the women's team as they changed from DII to NCAA Division I. Converse retired from coaching in 2017 as the winningest coach in AFA history.

Converse is also the author of Munich to Montreal: Olympic Swimming in a Tarnished Golden Era a book that explores the East German doping scandal in 1970 women's swimming, and the American women who fought against it. While writing, Converse worked as a consultant for The Last Gold, a documentary produced by USA Swimming to tell the same story.

Most recently, Converse was selected as one of the top 100 college swim coaches in the last 100 years by the College Swimming & Diving Coaches of America.

References 

 The 2011 University of Alabama Swimming and Diving Media Guide
 The 2010 Air Force Academy Athletics Website
Swimming World Magazine

External links 
 http://www.rolltide.com
  Casey Converse – Air Force Academy coach profile
 

1957 births
Living people
Air Force Falcons swimming coaches
Alabama Crimson Tide men's swimmers
American male freestyle swimmers
Olympic swimmers of the United States
Sportspeople from Topeka, Kansas
Swimmers at the 1976 Summer Olympics